Thalikulam  is a village in Thrissur district in the state of Kerala, India.

Demographics
 India census, Thalikulam had a population of 24,180 with 11,140 males and 13,050 females.

Sights 
Snehatheeram, is a park at Thalikulam beach. The beach was selected as the best beach tourism destination by the Kerala Department of Tourism (which also maintains the beach) during the year 2010.

Vallath temple, Eranezhath temple, Asheri temple, Thalikulagara temple, Cherkara Durgha devi temple are the main worship attractions.

References

Villages in Thrissur district